This is an incomplete list of people who have served as Lord Lieutenant of Hertfordshire. From 1660 the office holder was also Custos Rotulorum of Hertfordshire.

William Parr, 1st Marquess of Northampton 1553 –
Sir Ralph Sadleir 1570–?
Henry Carey, 1st Baron Hunsdon 1583–1585
Robert Dudley, 1st Earl of Leicester 3 July 1585 – 4 September 1588
William Cecil, 1st Baron Burghley 31 December 1588 – 4 August 1598
vacant
Robert Cecil, 1st Earl of Salisbury 5 August 1605 – 24 May 1612
William Cecil, 2nd Earl of Salisbury 10 July 1612 – 1642 jointly with
Charles Cecil, Viscount Cranborne 31 March 1640 – 1642
Interregnum
Arthur Capell, 1st Earl of Essex 26 July 1660 – 1681
John Egerton, 2nd Earl of Bridgewater 10 February 1681 – 26 October 1686
Laurence Hyde, 1st Earl of Rochester 18 November 1686 – 1688
Charles Talbot, 1st Duke of Shrewsbury 4 April 1689 – 1691
Algernon Capell, 2nd Earl of Essex 3 February 1692 – 10 January 1710
William Cowper, 1st Earl Cowper 26 August 1710 – 1712
James Cecil, 5th Earl of Salisbury 26 June 1712 – 1714
William Cowper, 1st Earl Cowper 5 March 1715 – 1722
William Capell, 3rd Earl of Essex 11 October 1722 – 8 January 1743
vacant
William Clavering-Cowper, 2nd Earl Cowper 8 March 1744 – 18 September 1764
William Capell, 4th Earl of Essex 12 November 1764 – 1771
James Cecil, 1st Marquess of Salisbury 13 March 1771 – 13 June 1823
James Grimston, 1st Earl of Verulam 5 July 1823 – 17 November 1845
James Grimston, 2nd Earl of Verulam 17 January 1846 – 1892
Edward Villiers, 5th Earl of Clarendon 23 August 1892 – 2 October 1914
Thomas Brand, 3rd Viscount Hampden 9 February 1915 – 1952
Sir David Bowes-Lyon 1 July 1952 – 13 September 1961
Sir George Burns 8 December 1961 – 12 February 1986
Sir Simon Bowes-Lyon 12 February 1986 – 27 July 2007
Dione Grimston, Countess of Verulam 27 July 2007 – 31 July 2017
Robert Voss,  4 August 2017 – present

Deputy lieutenants
A deputy lieutenant of Hertfordshire is commissioned by the Lord Lieutenant of Hertfordshire. Deputy lieutenants support the work of the lord-lieutenant. There can be several deputy lieutenants at any time, depending on the population of the county. Their appointment does not terminate with the changing of the lord-lieutenant, but they usually retire at age 75.

 1660 to 1682: Edward Harley
 1662 to 1688: Humphrey Cornewall
 1689 to 1700: Edward Harley
 1694 to 1715: Thomas Harley

21st Century
9 November 2009: Howard Anthony Guard

References

External links
Lord Lieutenant of Hertfordshire Website

Hertfordshire